Old Hill High Street railway station was a station on the former Great Western Railway's  Bumble Hole Line between  and . It was the second of the two stations in Old Hill, and its location in reference to the town centre was significantly more convenient than the station which exists today.

It opened in 1905 and closed in 1964.

References

Further reading

Disused railway stations in Dudley
Railway stations in Great Britain opened in 1905
Railway stations in Great Britain closed in 1964
Beeching closures in England
Former Great Western Railway stations